Pāda is the Sanskrit term for "foot" (cognate to English foot, Latin pes, Greek pous), with derived meanings "step, stride; footprint, trace; vestige, mark".
The term has a wide range of applications, including any one of four parts (as it were one foot of a quadruped), or any sub-division more generally, e.g. a chapter of a book (originally a section of a book divided in four parts).

In Sanskrit metre, pāda is the term for a metrical foot.

As a measure of length, a pada amounts to 12 or 15 fingers' breadth, or 1/2 or 1/3 or 3/7 of a Prakrama.

In Sanskrit grammar, a pada is any inflected word (noun or verb).

In Buddhism, pāda is the term for a Buddha footprint. Gautama Buddha’s footprints symbolized his presence, and his image and iconography developed several centuries after he had died. There are also several landmarks venerated as "footprints" (pāda, also pādamudrā) of Hindu deities. For example, Si Pada on Adam's Peak is a rock formation in Sri Lanka venerated as the footprint of Buddha in Buddhist tradition, the footprint of Shiva in Hinduism, and the footprint of Adam in Muslim tradition.

See also
Mudra
Paduka
Petrosomatoglyph

References
 Monier-Williams (1899)
Dictionary of Hindu Lore and Legend by Anna Dallapiccola

Sanskrit words and phrases
Pali words and phrases
Foot
Metrical feet
Indian poetics